Pioneer Days is a 1940 American western film directed by Harry S. Webb and starring Jack Randall, June Wilkins and Frank Yaconelli.

Plot
A private detective employed by a stagecoach company investigating a series of hold-ups on the route goes undercover to try and catch the guilty party. He comes to suspect it may be Slater, a man who has cheated the attractive Mary Leeds out of her half-share of a saloon bar.

Cast
 Jack Randall as Jack Dunham
 June Wilkins as 	Mary Leeds
 Frank Yaconelli as 	Manuel Gonzales Julian Ramariez
 Nelson McDowell as 	Judge Tobias Tarryton
 Ted Adams as Slater
 Bud Osborne as Saunders - Henchman
 Robert Walker as	Trigger - Henchman
 George Chesebro as 	Roper - Henchman
 Glenn Strange as 	Sheriff
 Jimmy Aubrey as Stagecoach Guard
 Lafe McKee as Sam - Express Agent
 Richard Cramer as Jim - Bartender
 Victor Adamson as 	Henchman

References

Bibliography
 Pitts, Michael R. Western Movies: A Guide to 5,105 Feature Films. McFarland, 2012.

External links
 

1940 films
1940 Western (genre) films
1940s English-language films
American Western (genre) films
Films directed by Harry S. Webb
American black-and-white films
Monogram Pictures films
1940s American films